Harry Schmidt (19 March 1916 – 13 February 1977) was a South African modern pentathlete. He competed at the 1952 and 1956 Summer Olympics.

References

External links
 

1916 births
1977 deaths
South African male modern pentathletes
Olympic modern pentathletes of South Africa
Modern pentathletes at the 1952 Summer Olympics
Modern pentathletes at the 1956 Summer Olympics
People from Queenstown, South Africa
Sportspeople from the Eastern Cape
20th-century South African people